Kalvin McRae (born August 30, 1985) is a former American football running back. He was released by the Kansas City Chiefs of the National Football League prior to the beginning of training camp. He was originally signed by the Chiefs as an undrafted free agent on April 27, 2008. He played college football for the Bobcats of Ohio University.

Early years
McRae is the son of Willie and Cheral. McRae attended Avondale High School in Avondale Estates, Georgia and was a student and a letterman in football, wrestling, and track. In football, he was named the teams' Most Valuable Player four times, was a three-time All-County selection, and as a senior, he was also a first team All-Region selection. In wrestling, McRae placed sixth at the State Tournament as a senior. Kelvin McRae graduated from Avondale High School in 2003.

College career
As a player for the Ohio Bobcats, McRae finished his career as the school's leader in rushing yards (4,398), 100-yard rushing games (21), rush attempts (909), rushing yards per game (91.6), all-purpose yards (5,248) and tied for the total touchdowns mark (49). During his junior season, he helped lead the Bobcats to a MAC East Division title, a MAC Championship Game appearance, and a 2007 GMAC Bowl appearance. In 2007, he set single-season school records with 1,434 rushing yards, 19 rushing touchdowns, 294 rush attempts and 119.5 rushing yards per game.

McRae led Ohio in rushing each year he was there, starting with his freshman year.

Statistics

~includes bowl game

References

External links
Ohio Bobcats bio

1985 births
Living people
People from Decatur, Georgia
Sportspeople from DeKalb County, Georgia
American football running backs
African-American players of American football
Ohio Bobcats football players
Ohio University alumni
People from Avondale Estates, Georgia
21st-century African-American sportspeople
20th-century African-American people